Nakışlı is a village in the Gerger District, Adıyaman Province, Turkey. The village is populated by Kurds of the Dirêjan tribe and had a population of 219 in 2021.

The hamlets of Akçalı, Boyalı and Sürmeli are attached to Nakışlı.

References

Villages in Gerger District
Kurdish settlements in Adıyaman Province